At least two ships of the Imperial Russian Navy have been named Peresvet after Alexander Peresvet.

  - 51-gun steam frigate stricken in 1874.
  - Lead ship of the  predreadnoughts that was scuttled during the Siege of Port Arthur in the Russo-Japanese War and sank after striking a mine in 1917.

Russian Navy ship names